Andrew Wooten (born September 30, 1989) is an American professional footballer who plays as a forward for German club Preußen Münster.

Club career

1. FC Kaiserslautern 
In 2009, Wooten signed with 1. FC Kaiserslautern II.  He made his debut for the first team in 2012.

Loan to SV Sandhausen 
Wooten joined SV Sandhausen on loan for the 2012–13 season, where he scored 7 goals in the 2. Bundesliga.

Loan to FSV Frankfurt 
In 2014, Wooten joined FSV Frankfurt on a short-term loan.

SV Sandhausen 
In June 2014, Wooten was permanently transferred to SV Sandhausen signing a three-year contract with them until 2017.

Philadelphia Union 
On June 20, 2019, Wooten signed a contract with the Philadelphia Union following the expiry of his previous contract with SV Sandhausen. Wooten's contract option was declined by Philadelphia following their 2020 season.

Admira Wacker 
On 20 January 2021, Wooten signed with Austrian club Admira Wacker.

VfL Osnabrück 
In June 2021 it was announced that Wooten would join VfL Osnabrück, newly relegated to the 3. Liga for the 2021–22 season.

International career
The son of a German mother and an American serviceman, Wooten is eligible for both Germany and the United States national teams. He has been called into a camp with the United States U-23 squad, but did not make an appearance at the youth level. Wooten received his first call up to the United States for a friendly against Peru on September 4, 2015 and made his debut as a substitute in a friendly match against Costa Rica on October 13, 2015.

Honors
Philadelphia Union
 Supporters Shield: 2020

References

External links
 
 

1989 births
Living people
Citizens of the United States through descent
American soccer players
United States men's international soccer players
German footballers
American people of German descent
German people of American descent
German people of African-American descent
Sportspeople from Bamberg
Association football forwards
Wormatia Worms players
1. FC Kaiserslautern II players
1. FC Kaiserslautern players
SV Sandhausen players
FSV Frankfurt players
Philadelphia Union players
FC Admira Wacker Mödling players
VfL Osnabrück players
SC Preußen Münster players
Bundesliga players
2. Bundesliga players
Major League Soccer players
Austrian Football Bundesliga players
Regionalliga players
Footballers from Bavaria